In a Heartbeat may refer to:

 In a Heartbeat (TV series), a Canadian-American television series
 In a Heartbeat (album), a 2005 album by Whit Dickey
 "In a Heartbeat" (Ringo Starr song), 1992
 "In a Heartbeat" (Sandra song), 2009
 "In a Heartbeat" (Sylvia Ratonel song), 2011
 In a Heartbeat (film), a 2017 animated short film by Beth David and Esteban Bravo